Dakan (also Romanized as Dākān; also known as Dādkān and Dukkān) is a village in Ramand-e Shomali Rural District, Khorramdasht District, Takestan County, Qazvin Province, Iran. At the 2006 census, its population was 985, in 274 families.

References 

Populated places in Takestan County